Chagnaadorjiin Ganzorig (born April 24, 1982 in Bulgan sum, Arkhangai aimag) is an amateur Mongolian freestyle wrestler, who played for the men's light heavyweight category. Between 2006 and 2008, Ganzorig had won a total of three medals (one gold and two silver) for the 84 kg class at the Asian Wrestling Championships.

Ganzorig represented Mongolia at the 2008 Summer Olympics in Beijing, where he competed for the men's 84 kg class. He lost the qualifying round match to Azerbaijan's Novruz Temrezov, with a three-set technical score (0–3, 1–0, 0–3), and a classification point score of 1–3.

References

External links
 
 
 NBC Olympics Profile

1982 births
Living people
Olympic wrestlers of Mongolia
Wrestlers at the 2008 Summer Olympics
Wrestlers at the 2006 Asian Games
Mongolian male sport wrestlers
Asian Games competitors for Mongolia
20th-century Mongolian people
21st-century Mongolian people